Rodrigo Lombardi (born 15 October 1976) is a Brazilian actor and voice actor. He is known for his roles in various Brazilian telenovelas such as Caminho das Índias (2009), Passione (2010), Salve Jorge (2012), among others.

Filmography

Films

Television

Awards and nominations

References

External links

1976 births
Living people
Male actors from São Paulo
Brazilian people of Italian descent
Brazilian male television actors
Brazilian male film actors
Brazilian male telenovela actors